The 1977 Chico State Wildcats football team represented California State University, Chico as a member of the Far Western Conference (FWC) during the 1977 NCAA Division II football season. Led by fourth-year head coach Dick Trimmer, Chico State compiled an overall record of 6–2–1 with a mark of 3–1–1 in conference play, placing second in the FWC. The team outscored its opponents 159 to 137 for the season. The Wildcats played home games at University Stadium in Chico, California.

Schedule

References

Chico State
Chico State Wildcats football seasons
Chico State Wildcats football